Disco Nouveau is the first compilation album of Ann Arbor, Michigan record label Ghostly International.  Released in 2002, the album served as a modern update of Giorgio Moroder's famed Italo disco sound of the 1970s and 1980s and includes contributions from artists such as Solvent, ADULT., and Susumu Yokota.  It served as a major inspiration to the (at the time) burgeoning electroclash movement and has been praised for its persistent relevance in much the same way as Moroder himself.

Disco Nouveau Track listing
 Daniel Wang "Pistol Oderso" 
 ADULT. "Nite Life"
 Legowelt "Disco Rout"
 Solvent "My Radio" 
 I-F featuring Nancy Fortune "Holographic Voice"
 DMX Krew featuring Tracy "Make Me"         
 Perspects "They Keep Dancing"
 Ectomorph "Lost Angles"
 Susumu Yokota "Re: Disco"
 Mat-101 "Haunted House" 
 Charles Manier "Change You"
 Lowfish "No Longer Accepting Complaints"
 Hong Kong Counterfeit "Metal Disco Rmx"
 Memory Boy "There Is No Electricity"

References

Ghostly International albums
2002 compilation albums
Dance music compilation albums
Electronic compilation albums